Salvador Reyes Monteón (September 20, 1936 – December 29, 2012) was a Mexican professional footballer. He played for Guadalajara with 122 goals and 7 championships. Reyes won his first championship in 1957, from then on the club became unstoppable, winning six more titles. He was the last member from the club to win Campeon de Goleo (Goal scorer champion) until Omar Bravo won it on April 28, 2007, with 11 goals. It had been 45 years since a player from Guadalajara won the Campeon de Goleo.

Goal scorers

 
Salvador Reyes won cups and scored 14 goals for the football team from 1956 to 1966, and participated in three FIFA World Cups: 1958, 1962, 1966.

After retirement he would regularly go to Tala, Jalisco to play. His father and brother would coach teams residing there.

At the age of 71, Reyes was registered by Chivas de Guadalajara for the 2008 Clausura season. On January 19, 2008, Reyes was part of the Chivas starting lineup v Pumas de la UNAM at Estadio Jalisco, as part of a tribute organised by the club in his honour. Reyes stayed 50 seconds on the field, being replaced by Omar Bravo and becoming the oldest footballer to play in Mexican Primera División.

In January 2013, Reyes' #8 was definitely retired by Guadalajara.

International goals

|-
| 1. || April 4, 1957 || Mexico City, Mexico ||  || 3–0 || Win || 1958 FIFA World Cup qualification
|-
| 2. || May 24, 1959 || Mexico City, Mexico ||  || 2–1 || Win || Friendly
|-
| 3. || November 6, 1960 || Chicago, United States ||  || 3–3 || Draw || 1962 FIFA World Cup qualification
|-
| 4. || November 13, 1960 || Mexico City, Mexico ||  || 3–0 || Win || 1962 FIFA World Cup qualification
|-
| 5. || April 5, 1961 || Mexico City, Mexico ||  || 7–0 || Win || 1962 FIFA World Cup qualification
|-
| 6. || April 29, 1961 || Ostrava, Czechoslovakia ||  || 1–2 || Loss || Friendly
|-
| 7. || October 29, 1961 || Mexico City, Mexico ||  || 1–0 || Win || 1962 FIFA World Cup qualification
|-
| 8. || April 25, 1962 || Mexico City, Mexico ||  || 1–0 || Win || Friendly
|-
| 9. || March 4, 1965 || Mexico City, Mexico  ||  || 3–0 || Win || Friendly
|- 
| 10. || March 7, 1965 || Los Angeles, United States ||  || 2–2 || Draw || 1966 FIFA World Cup qualification

Current careers
Salvador Reyes worked with Chivas USA as a mentor helping to develop the Fuerzas Basicas of the club. He was at The San Bernardino Soccer Complex in 2003 when the Project Sangre Nueva was in development for Chivas U.S. He was part of helping scout the best players for the event and ever since he stayed with the club.

At the age of 71, he was honored by Chivas by making the first kick in a game against Pumas on January 19, 2008.

References

External links
 
 

1936 births
Mexico international footballers
C.D. Guadalajara footballers
Footballers from Jalisco
1958 FIFA World Cup players
1962 FIFA World Cup players
1966 FIFA World Cup players
Liga MX players
National Professional Soccer League (1967) players
Los Angeles Toros players
Mexican expatriate footballers
Mexican footballers
Mexican expatriate sportspeople in the United States
Expatriate soccer players in the United States
2012 deaths
Association football forwards